Tum Dena Saath Mera is a Hindi language Indian television drama series which premiered on 23 November 2009 on DD National. The series is produced by television actor, Rahul Bhat and focuses on the life of physically challenged people.

Plot
The story revolves around the life of a blind girl, Simran who falls in love with a mute boy, Samarjeet, her childhood friend (both physically challenged people).

Cast
 Piku Sharma ... Simran 
Amit ... Samarjeet 
 Gajendra Chauhan ... Gurnam Singh (Simran's father)
 Rajeev Verma
 Hemant Chadha ... Lakhwinder Singh 
 Supriya Karnik ... (Simran's sister)
 Rajeev Verma ... (Samarjeet's friend)

References

External links
Tum Dena Saath Mera News Article

DD National original programming
Indian drama television series
2010s Indian television series
2009 Indian television series debuts